Slobodan Jovanović (born 19 February 1997) is a Serbian professional basketball player for Vršac of the Basketball League of Serbia.

Professional career
In December 2015, 18-year-old Jovanović signed his first professional contract with Partizan Belgrade. Prior to 2017–18 season, he was loaned to the OKK Beograd.

International career
Jovanović represented the Serbia men's national under-16 basketball team at the 2013 FIBA Europe Under-16 Championship where they won the silver medal. The following year he was part of the U17 national team that won the bronze medal at the 2014 FIBA Under-17 World Championship.

References

External links
 Slobodan Jovanović at eurobasket.com
 Slobodan Jovanović at KK Partizan official website

1997 births
Living people
ABA League players
Basketball League of Serbia players
Basketball players from Belgrade
KK Dynamic players
KK Partizan players
OKK Beograd players
OKK Spars players
KK Metalac Valjevo players
KK Vršac players
Serbian expatriate basketball people in Bosnia and Herzegovina
Serbian men's basketball players
Shooting guards